Cedar Park and Beth El Cemetery is a cemetery located in Emerson and Paramus, in Bergen County, New Jersey, United States.

Noted interments 
 Martin Balsam (1919–1996) Academy Award winning best supporting actor
 Julian Beck (1925–1985), actor, director, poet, and painter
 Maxwell Bodenheim (1891–1954), poet and novelist
 Ernst Cassirer (1874–1945), philosopher
 Manfred Clynes (1925–2020), scientist and inventor
 Myron Cohen (1902–1986), comedian and storyteller
 Sammy Fain (1902–1989), composer of popular music
 Leonard Farbstein (1902–1993), US Congressman
Eliezer Greenberg (1896–1977), American Yiddish poet
 Lou Jacobi (1913–2009), character actor
 Kitty Kallen (1921–2016), big-band singer
 Estee Lauder (1908–2004), businesswoman, cosmetics mogul
 Joe E. Lewis (1902–1971), comedian and singer
 John Marley (1907–1984), actor
 B.S. Pully (1910–1972), actor
 Delmore Schwartz (1913–1966), poet
 Isaac Bashevis Singer (1903–1991), winner of the Nobel Prize for Literature.

See also
 Bergen County Cemeteries

References

External links 
 
 
 

Cemeteries in Bergen County, New Jersey
Emerson, New Jersey
Paramus, New Jersey
Jewish cemeteries in New Jersey